On Heaven and Earth is a book that presents conversations between Argentine Cardinal Jorge Bergoglio, who later became Pope Francis, and Argentine rabbi Abraham Skorka. The book is about faith, family and the Catholic Church in the 21st century. It was first published in Spanish in 2010 and appeared in an English translation in 2013.

Among the comments that attracted particular attention following Bergoglio's election to the papacy were these:

See also

References

2010 non-fiction books
Books about Christianity
Books by Pope Francis
Argentine books
Books about Judaism